Gard Filip Gjerdalen (born 25 March 1982) is a Norwegian cross-country skier.

His only start in the World Cup to date was in March 2006 in Mora, where he finished in a fifteenth place. He also featured in many Marathon Cup races in 2006 and 2007, recording a sixth place over 50 km in January 2006 in Bedřichov.

He represents the sports club IL Holeværingen, and lives in Hole. He is the brother of fellow skiers Tord Asle Gjerdalen and Njål Tage Gjerdalen.

Cross-country skiing results
All results are sourced from the International Ski Federation (FIS).

World Cup

Season standings

References

1982 births
Living people
Norwegian male cross-country skiers
People from Buskerud
Sportspeople from Viken (county)